Cassill Place Historic District is a national historic district located at Carthage, Jasper County, Missouri.   The district encompasses eight contributing buildings in an exclusively residential section Carthage.  It developed between about 1890 and 1925 and includes representative examples of Late Victorian and Bungalow / American Craftsman style architecture. The buildings include the Macoubrie House (1903), Former Herrin Home (c. 1890), Fenimore House (c. 1890), McFadden House (c. 1925), Meister House (c. 1890), A. H. McFadden House (1914), Former Eugene O'Keefe House (c. 1893), and Dennison House (c. 1914).

It was listed on the National Register of Historic Places in 1986.

References

Historic districts on the National Register of Historic Places in Missouri
Victorian architecture in Missouri
Bungalow architecture in Missouri
Buildings and structures in Jasper County, Missouri
National Register of Historic Places in Jasper County, Missouri